{{DISPLAYTITLE:C20H14}}
The molecular formula C20H14 (molar mass: 254.32 g/mol, exact mass: 254.1096 u) may refer to:

 1,1'-Binaphthyl
 Triptycene

Molecular formulas